Fittonia (nerve plant) is a genus of flowering plants in the acanthus family Acanthaceae, native to tropical rainforest in South America, mainly Peru.

The most commonly grown are F. albivenis and its cultivars. They bear lush green leaves with accented veins of white to deep pink and have a short fuzz covering their stems. Small buds may appear after a time where the stem splits into leaves. They can also be propagated by allowing the trimmings of the tip to grow roots in about 1-2 weeks. Flowers are small with a white to off-white colour. Plants are best kept in a moist area with mild sunlight and temperatures above , therefore in temperate areas they must be grown as houseplants. Without water for a few days, this plant is known to "faint" but is easily revived with a quick watering. Its spreading habit makes it ideal as groundcover.

Species
Fittonia albivenis
Fittonia gigantea

References

External links
 IPNI Listing
 Kew Plant List
 
 
 

Acanthaceae
Acanthaceae genera